Copa Bernardo O'Higgins was a national football tournament disputed between Brazil and Chile, from 1955 to 1966. The competition, played on a two-legged format,  was similar to other tournaments played at the time, such as the Roca Cup between Argentina and Brazil.

The cup's name was a tribute to Bernardo O'Higgins, a figure of great importance in Chile's independence, and considered one of the liberators of South America during the Spanish occupation in the colonial period.

List of champions

Match details

1955

1957

1959

1961

1966

Notes

References 

Brazil national football team matches
Chile national football team matches
International association football competitions hosted by Chile
International association football competitions hosted by Brazil
Defunct international association football competitions in South America
Recurring sporting events established in 1955
Recurring sporting events disestablished in 1966